Petrosavia is a genus in the family Petrosaviaceae.  It includes three species from eastern and southeastern Asia.

 Petrosavia sakuraii (Makino) J.J.Sm. ex Steenis (syn P. miyoshia-sakuraii) - Japan (Mino Province), China (Guangxi, Sichuan, Taiwan), Vietnam, Myanmar, Sumatra
 Petrosavia sinii (K.Krause) Gagnep. in H.Lecomte - Guangxi Province of China
 Petrosavia stellaris Becc. - Borneo, Sulawesi, Sumatra, Peninsular Malaysia

References

Petrosaviales
Monocot genera
Taxa named by Odoardo Beccari